Wang Kai (born 18 August 1982) is a Chinese actor. He is known for his television roles in All Quiet in Peking (2014), The Disguiser (2015), Nirvana in Fire (2015), Ode to Joy (2016), When a Snail Falls in Love (2016), Stay With Me (2016), and Like a Flowing River (2018), as well as his film role in The Devotion of Suspect X.

Early life and education 
Wang was born in Wuhan in Hubei Province. Although he wanted to become an actor after performing Thunderstorm in school, his father wanted him to do sports while his mother wanted him to find a stable job. As a result, he worked as a book porter at Xinhua Bookstore after high school. During his free time, he took on side jobs such as attending activities organized by TV stations, taking model-training courses, and shooting commercials. 
In 2002, during the shooting of a commercial, the director suggested Wang attend an acting academy. Wang resigned from his job and moved to Shanghai to take courses on acting at the Shanghai Theatre Academy in 2002. The next year, he applied for the Beijing Film Academy and the Central Academy of Drama. Wang received offers from both academies, and chose to attend the latter.

Career

Beginnings. 
While a student at the Central Academy of Drama, Wang received his first acting role in Cold Autumn (2006), upon recommendation of his professor Zhang Xiaolong (张晓龙). In 2006, he participated in his first film Miao gou renxin (妙狗人心, 2007), an animal movie which focuses on dogs.
 
In 2007, Wang graduated from the Central Academy of Drama and signed with Huayi Brothers. During his first year with Huayi, he received no roles except for a minor role in Water Point Peach Blossom by Ma Lujian, the director of Cold Autumn. He also had a minor role in the romantic comedy drama Calling For Love. As the series would be aired in Taiwan, he learned to speak with a Taiwanese accent for the role.

2008–13: Rising popularity 
Wang's first breakthrough in the industry was his casting in Ugly Wudi, adapted from the American comedy series Ugly Betty. The TV series was a commercial success, with all four seasons being the highest viewed in its time slot. Although he tried out for the male lead, he was instead offered the role of Chen Jiaming, a sassy advertising director. Wang continued to play the role for all four seasons of the series’ run between 2008 and 2010. While filming Ugly Wudi, he left Huayi Brothers and signed with the series’ production company, Nesound International.

After the success of Ugly Wudi, Wang found himself offered roles similar to his role in the series. Unwilling to be typecast, he rejected them all. Finally, he was offered the role of the a rugged and uneducated youth in Youth (2012). He then starred in New Detective Squad (2013), a Republican-era detective series loosely based on The Three Heroes and Five Gallants. The series had high viewership in mainland China and developed a small cult following online.

2014–2015: Breakthrough 
In 2013, with the disbandment of Nesound's management department, Wang joined Shandong Television & Film. His first role under the company was a police officer in the critically acclaimed historical drama All Quiet in Peking, which was released in 2014. This marked a turning point in his career. Wang was praised for his ability to hold his own ground against multiple acclaimed veteran actors. The same year, he starred in the historical film, A Murder Beside Yanhe River, where he plays a Chinese Workers' and Peasants' Red Army officer who becomes a murder suspect. The film premiered in December 2014, and Wang received his first acting award, the Best New Actor Award at the 9th Chinese Youth Film Forum for his performance in the film.

In December 2014, when producer Hou Hongliang resigned from Shandong Film & Television to focus on Daylight Entertainment Ltd., Wang left with him for Daylight Entertainment. He then starred in three television series produced by Daylight Entertainment: Nirvana in Fire, The Disguiser, and Love Me If You Dare. Wang played a loyal and capable triple agent in The Disguiser, the neglected prince Xiao Jingyan who climbs his way to the throne with the help of his best friend in Nirvana in Fire and the protagonist's best friend in Love Me If You Dare. 

Following the airing of these dramas, Wang experienced a sharp rise in popularity. He was nominated for the Best Actor award at the Huading Awards and Shanghai Television Festival for his performance in The Disguiser and Nirvana in Fire respectively, and won the Best Supporting Actor award at the Asia Rainbow TV Awards. Wang had become a regular in both magazines and fashion events, and also received several endorsement deals.

2016–present: Mainstream success 
In 2016, he featured in metropolitan romance drama Ode to Joy. Although he did not appear until episode 11, Wang in association with the show was one of the most discussed topics on social media. He reunited with his Ode to Joy co-star Wang Ziwen in crime thriller When a Snail Falls in Love, adapted from Ding Mo's novel of the same name. The same year, Wang starred alongside Joe Chen in romance drama Stay with Me and in Jackie Chan's action comedy film Railroad Tigers.

In 2017, Wang starred in mystery-thriller The Devotion of Suspect X, adapted from the Japanese novel of the same name. The film was a box office success. The same year, he was announced to be playing Cao Cao in the upcoming film adaptation of popular RPG game Dynasty Warriors.

In 2018, Wang starred in A Better Tomorrow 2018, directed by Ding Sheng and a remake of the original classic. He returned to the small screen with the period drama Like a Flowing River, based on the novel Da Jiang Da He written by A Nai and set during Chinese economic reform in 1978. The drama was a critical and commercial success, receiving positive reviews and topping ratings in its time slot. Wang received acclaim for his portrayal of a talented young man who fought against all odds to eventually becomes a technical engineer. He was nominated for the Magnolia Award for Best Actor in a Television Series. In addition to being an actor, he also made a music debut, in the form of his crossover album World of One, which sold well. One of the songs in the album, "Loneliness for One", is speculated to be a reflection of his early state of mind when he made his acting debut.

In 2020, Wang starred in historical drama Held in the Lonely Castle, portraying Emperor Renzong of Song. The same year, he starred in the crime thriller drama Hunting as a police officer. He guest starred as Secretary Pan in 2021's Minning Town.

Other activities
In February 2016, Wang co-founded Deshe Entertainment (Tianjin) Ltd. The company's co-investor is Daylight Entertainment, and its legal representative is Hou Hongliang.

Social
Wang was part of Han Hong's charity campaign to provide medical assistance in Gansu. He was made ambassador of "1219 Long Love" public event in Beijing, Estée Lauder Companies's Greater China's Breast Cancer Awareness Pink ribbon program and appointed the Traffic Safety Ambassador for Beijing.

Filmography

Film

Television series

Variety show

Discography

Albums

Singles

Awards and nominations

Forbes China Celebrity 100

References

External links 
 Wang Kai on Weibo

1982 births
Male actors from Wuhan
Living people
Chinese male film actors
Chinese male television actors
Central Academy of Drama alumni
21st-century Chinese male actors